Polychrome is a cloud fairy and the youngest daughter of the Rainbow, thus she is a "sky princess". She first appears in The Road to Oz (1909), which is the fifth book of the original fourteen Oz books by American author by L. Frank Baum. She also appears several times in later Oz stories of the classic series, and has a titular role in the modern sequel Polychrome: A Romantic Fantasy by Ryk E. Spoor.

Appearances
When Dorothy Gale, her pet dog Toto, the Shaggy Man, and Button-Bright first encounter Polychrome in the fifth chapter of The Road to Oz, she is seen dancing to keep herself warm, after accidentally sliding off her father's rainbow and landing on the surface of the Earth. (Her father withdrew his bow without realizing she had been left behind.) Polychrome is described as:

In personality she is sweet and ethereal, very much the archetypical good fairy. She is very sensitive to cold and, while on Earth, often dances to keep warm. Polychrome states that she normally only consumes insubstantial foods such as dewdrops and mist. While on Earth, she can subsist on only minuscule morsels of human food. She is well known in the series for her daintiness and grace, and is considered to be an equal in beauty to Princess Ozma herself.

Polychrome is more a decorative than an active presence in The Road to Oz, but she makes positive contributions in her subsequent appearances in Baum's fictions. In Tik-Tok of Oz (1914), she summons the dragon Quox to rescue the captured Ozites from the Nome King (The Nome King is dazzled by the beautiful fairy and begs her to remain in his underground realm, which she refuses).

In The Tin Woodman of Oz (1918), she rescues the rusted Captain Fyter the Tin Soldier by oiling his joints, just as Dorothy had done for the Tin Woodman in The Wonderful Wizard of Oz (1900), and she uses her magic to let the protagonists fit through a rabbit hole. She also restores Tommy Kwikstep to normal.

In Sky Island (1912), she provides the solution to the central characters' main problem.

Portrayals
Polychrome was played by Dolly Castles in the 1913 stage play, The Tik-Tok Man of Oz by Baum, Louis F. Gottschalk, Victor Schertzinger, and Oliver Morosco.  In the play, she sings a duet with Ruggedo titled "When in Trouble Come to Papa".

Polychrome appears briefly in the coronation sequence of Return to Oz.  Though the role is an extra, Allen Eyles's The World of Oz features a production still crediting the role to Cherie Hawkins, who later served for a time on the staff of the theatre department at University of Alaska Anchorage.

References

Oz (franchise) characters
Female characters in literature
Fictional fairies and sprites
Literary characters introduced in 1909
Rainbows in culture
Fictional princesses